Shantipur Junction railway station is a Junction railway station of the Kolkata Suburban Railway system and operated by Eastern Railway. It is situated in Shantipur, Nadia at the end of Kalinarayanpur to Shantipur loop line connecting with the Ranaghat–Krishnanagar line.

References

Sealdah railway division
Railway stations in Nadia district
Kolkata Suburban Railway stations